Savita Punia (born 11 July 1990) is an Indian field hockey player and is a member of the India women's national field hockey team. She hails from Haryana and plays as the goalkeeper. Savita Punia is also known as "Great Wall of India" because of her phenomenal and outstanding performance in 2020 Summer Olympics. Indian Female hockey team missed the bronze medal in Tokyo Olympic 2020 by just a margin.

Early life
Savita Punia was born on 11 July 1990 in Jodhkan village of Sirsa district in Haryana. She was sent to the district headquarters for better schooling. She was enrolled in the sports academy. She was encouraged by her grandfather Mahinder Singh to take up hockey and joined the Sports Authority of India (SAI) center at Hisar. She was coached by Sunder Singh Kharab during her early years and later coached by Azad Singh Malik. She was initially not too interested in the game, but later, when her father spent Twenty Thousand Rupees on her kit, she started to see the game in a new light and got serious about it. In 2007, Punia was picked for a maiden national camp in Lucknow, and she trained with a top goalkeeper.

Career
In 2008, Punia made her first international tour, a four-nation event in Netherlands and Germany. She made her senior international debut in the year 2011. She has featured in more than 100 games at the international level. She qualified for the national team in 2007 when she was barely 17. In 2009, she participated as a member of the team in the Junior Asia Cup. In 2013, she participated in the Eighth Women's Asia Cup held in Malaysia in which she saved two crucial potential goals in the penalty shoot-out and paved the way for India to win a Bronze medal. She was a part of the bronze-winning team at the 2014 Incheon Asian Games.

In the year 2016, she displayed excellent performance when she withstood a barrage of penalty corners against Japan in the last 1 minute to help India hold on to its 1–0 lead. She helped the team qualify for the Rio Olympics after 36 years. In the Asia Cup of 2018, she made an astonishing save against China in the final, earning herself the goalkeeper of the tournament award and for her team, a slot in the 2018 World Cup in London.

She performed effectively at the Hawke's Bay Cup in New Zealand and helped her team finish 6th in the tournament.

Her outstanding performance helped the women's Indian team to beat Chile  in the final match of the Women's Hockey World League Round 2.

In an interview in 2016, Punia revealed that she had been promised a job under the Haryana Government's Medal Lao, Naukri Pao scheme, but hasn't got it. A year later too, she said that nothing had changed.

Accolades
She was awarded the Baljit Singh Goalkeeper of the Year award at the Hockey India Annual Awards in 2015, for having phenomenal performances for India in international contributions which proved her worth as the best goalkeeper in the country. She also received a cash reward of 1 lakh rupees for her contribution to the sports.

References

External links

Savita Punia at Hockey India

1987 births
Living people
Indian female field hockey players
21st-century Indian women
21st-century Indian people
Asian Games medalists in field hockey
Asian Games silver medalists for India
Asian Games bronze medalists for India
Female field hockey goalkeepers
Field hockey players at the 2014 Asian Games
Field hockey players at the 2016 Summer Olympics
Field hockey players at the 2020 Summer Olympics
Field hockey players at the 2018 Asian Games
Field hockey players from Haryana
Medalists at the 2014 Asian Games
Medalists at the 2018 Asian Games
Olympic field hockey players of India
Sportswomen from Haryana
Field hockey players at the 2014 Commonwealth Games
Field hockey players at the 2018 Commonwealth Games
Field hockey players at the 2022 Commonwealth Games
Commonwealth Games bronze medallists for India
Commonwealth Games medallists in field hockey
Recipients of the Arjuna Award
Medallists at the 2022 Commonwealth Games